The Queens Community Board 1 is a local advisory group in New York City, encompassing the neighborhoods of Astoria, Long Island City, Queensbridge, Ditmars, Ravenswood, Steinway, Garden Bay, and Woodside, in the Borough of Queens. It also includes Rikers Island, the citywide correctional complex, which is within the Borough of the Bronx but connected by its only bridge to Astoria. The Board's district is delimited by the East River on both west and north, by the Brooklyn–Queens Expressway on the east, and by Northern Boulevard, the Long Island Rail Road and Bridge Plaza North on the south.

As of September 21, 2015, the current chairperson is to be determined by vote, and the District Manager is Florence Koulouris.

Demographics

As of the United States Census, 2000, the Community Board had a population of 211,220, up from 188,549 in 1990 and 185,198 in 1980. 

Of them (as of 2000), 88,606 (41.9%) were White non-Hispanic, 21,581 (10.2%) were African American, 27,399 (13.0%) were Asian or Pacific Islander, 475 (0.2%) were American Indian or Native Alaskan, 3,099 (1.5%) were of some other race, 12,368 (5.9%) were of two or more races, and 57,692 (27.3%) were Hispanic.

As of 2004, 23.4% of the population benefited from public assistance, which was up from 13.2% in 2000.

Geography

References

External links
Profile of the Community Board

Community boards of Queens